In college football, 2018 NCAA football bowl games may refer to:

2017–18 NCAA football bowl games, for games played in January 2018 as part of the 2017 season.
2018–19 NCAA football bowl games, for games played in December 2018 as part of the 2018 season.